Gåsvær Chapel is a chapel of the Church of Norway in Herøy Municipality in Nordland county, Norway. It is located in the Gåsvær islands. It is an annex chapel in the Herøy parish which is part of the Nord-Helgeland prosti (deanery) in the Diocese of Sør-Hålogaland. The white, wooden chapel was built in a long church style in 1951 using plans drawn up by the architect Peder Stavnes. The chapel seats about 100 people.

History
The islands of Gåsvær were once quite populated with many homes, shops, and schools. Many fishermen and their families lived there. In the 1940s and early 1950s a local chapter of the Norwegian YMCA was established in Gåsvær. This group decided to build a prayer chapel for the islands. The new chapel was consecrated in June 1951. In 1967, the small chapel was enlarged and upgraded to the status of a "chapel" rather than a simple prayer house. Over time, the islands have depopulated since the islands are not accessible by road. The church is rarely used anymore since no one permanently lives on the island. Currently there is one worship service held at this church each July when vacationers are visiting the holiday cottages on the island.

See also
List of churches in Sør-Hålogaland

References

Herøy, Nordland
Churches in Nordland
Wooden churches in Norway
20th-century Church of Norway church buildings
Churches completed in 1951
1951 establishments in Norway
Long churches in Norway